Isla Traquair (born 1 January 1980) is a Scottish television host, producer and journalist. She has worked with STV, Channel 5, and ITN. She is currently based between the UK and North America where she is the host of the TV show Buy.o.logic on the Oprah Winfrey Network.

Early life
Traquair was born in Aberdeen on New Year's Day 1980 to parents Ian Traquair, a software developer, and Maureen Traquair, a school teacher. She has 3 brothers. She is the great great granddaughter of Phoebe Anna Traquair (1852–1936), a Scottish artist.

At the age of 15, Traquair began working one day a week at a press agency fitting it in around her studies. During this work placement, Traquair wrote a front-page story in a national paper about job losses due to the beef crisis.

Newspaper journalism
In 1996, after cutting short her final year at school, Traquair was selected from hundreds of entrants to take part in an in-house training scheme with Aberdeen Journals. She remained with the newspaper group for nearly five years; for the last two she was the crime and court reporter for local Aberdeenshire broadsheet The Press and Journal.

Television career

In Scotland
Traquair joined Grampian Television (now STV North) in early 2001 as a reporter, presenter and producer for North Tonight, Grampian Headlines, Grampian News and North Today.

Traquair's interest in crime also led to STV North and Central's TV series Unsolved which looked into Scotland's most intriguing murder mysteries. Traquair was involved in all three series, writing and producing the final series. The series sold worldwide.

ITV and Five News
Traquair left STV for ITV News in November 2006. She became a national correspondent in London covering stories all over Europe.

Traquair left ITV News to join Five News as a news correspondent and presenter. In June 2008, it was announced that she and Matt Barbet would stand-in for Natasha Kaplinsky during her maternity leave. Traquair continued to be the anchor of the 7:00 pm news programme after Kaplinsky's return. After Traquair left Five News, the slot was taken over by a chat show.

Other programmes
Traquair has also hosted movie special programmes for Channel Five, Fiver and Five USA in which she interviewed Hollywood A-list celebrities including Tom Hanks, Meryl Streep, Christian Bale and Leonardo DiCaprio, who were promoting their films in Europe.

Traquair moved to Canada in January 2011. She was the host of Buy.o.logic which is filmed in British Columbia and airs on the Oprah Winfrey Network. The 13-part first series aired in Spring and Summer 2012.

Charity work
In 2005, Traquair and four colleagues took part in a ten-day challenge through the dense Sangklaburi jungle in Thailand. They raised almost £30,000 for Children's Hospice Association Scotland and Maggie's Cancer Caring Centres. The team were trained by an ex-marine for several months prior to the trek in order to become fit enough for the gruelling challenge.

Personal life
Traquair separated from her husband in 2007 and later divorced. A male neighbour was convicted of stalking Traquair in July 2022.

Traquair's interests out of work include films, music, golf, drumming, swimming, skiing, painting, and cooking. She has, on occasion, baked specially designed cakes for her celebrity guests.

Traquair is a lifelong fan of Arsenal and is a member of the Arsenal Scotland Supporters Club.

References

External links
 
 Buy.o.logic

1980 births
Living people
People from Aberdeen
Scottish journalists
Scottish women journalists
STV News newsreaders and journalists
ITN newsreaders and journalists
5 News presenters and reporters